Tereingaornis moisleyi, also referred to as Moisley's penguin, is a genus and species of extinct penguin from the Middle Pliocene of New Zealand. It was slightly smaller than the extant Fiordland crested penguin. It was described by Ron Scarlett in 1983 from fossil material (a coracoid, humerus and other bones) found by William Moisley near Te Reinga Falls on the Wairoa River, in the Hawke's Bay Region of the North Island. Another specimen was found later at Waihi Beach, Hawera, on the South Taranaki Bight. The genus name Tereingaornis combines the name of the type locality with the Greek ornis ("bird"); the specific epithet honours the discoverer of the fossil.

References

Fossil taxa described in 1983
Birds described in 1983
Spheniscidae
Pliocene birds
Extinct birds of New Zealand
Extinct penguins
Prehistoric bird genera
Extinct monotypic bird genera